The Matadi–Kinshasa Railway is a railway line in Kongo Central province between Kinshasa, the capital of Democratic Republic of the Congo, and the port of Matadi.

The Matadi–Kinshasa Railway was built between 1890 and 1898 in order to bypass the series of rapids and falls which hindered access from the South Atlantic Ocean to the Congo Basin. The line reopened in September 2015 after about a decade without regular service. As of April, 2016 there was one passenger trip per week along the line and more frequent service was planned.

History 

In the 1880s the exploration and exploitation of the Congo territory was carried out by the Congo Free State, which benefitted from hydrographic network of the Congo River. Transport was done by human bearers, which was not very efficient and often fatal. Therefore, it was decided to build a railway line along this route.

The Compagnie du Congo pour le Commerce et l'Industrie (CCCI) was incorporated on 31 July 1887. On the same day its subsidiary the Compagnie du Chemin de Fer du Congo (CCFC) was created. Work on the railway was directed by Albert Thys, who would give his name to one of the stations, Thysville (now Mbanza-Ngungu). The completion of the railway officially cost the lives of 1,932 people (1,800 Africans and 132 Europeans), although the real numbers were likely higher. Up to 60,000 labourers worked on the project at one time.

The main difficulty was to make it possible for the railway line to leave the gorges of the Congo River, through the canyon of the M'pozo River and a passage along the Monts de Cristal.

The living conditions in the construction of this railway were miserable. The sanitary and medical facilities were insufficient. In 1892, about two thousand people worked on the railroad, of which an average of one hundred and fifty workers per month lost their lives due to smallpox, dysentery, beriberi and exhaustion. By the end of 1892, 7,000 workers had already been recruited, 3,500 of whom had died or fled (for example, to neighboring forests). These conditions made it more difficult to recruit workers. Thys therefore attracted people from Barbados and China in September and November 1892 respectively. The Barbadians refused to leave the boats in the port of Matadi until they were forced by firearms. Seven people lost their lives in this action.

The hard labour on the railway line is mentioned by Joseph Conrad in his novel Heart of Darkness, which he witnessed when he worked in the Congo Free State. It is also shown in the 2016 movie The Legend of Tarzan.

Started in 1890, the railway line was completed in 1898. Alterations were made from 1923 to 1931, when it was converted to  gauge on a new alignment. Several tens of thousands of people, convicts and forced workers, were employed for this renovation. Seven thousand people lost their lives here.

In spite of the technical and financial difficulties related to the construction of the railway line, the railway line very quickly proved to be profitable, mainly because of the transportation of ivory and rubber. As a  gauge railway it operated a large fleet of 0-6-0T, 0-6-2T, 2-6-2T locomotives before turning to 32 0-6-0+0-6-0 Garratts, and finally 5 - outside-framed 2-8-2 locomotives.

The railway can be classified as a portage railway.

Border change 

In 1928, Congo (Belgium) and Angola (Portugal) did a land exchange to facilitate the new route of the railway to Congo-Kinshasa.

Specifications

Main stations 

 Matadi (elevation: 1 m), ocean port up river
 Songololo (301 m)
 Mbanza-Ngungu (604 m), terminus of short branch; workshops
 Kintoni (380 m)
 Madimba (438 m)
 Kasangulu (339 m)
 Kinshasa (177 m) railhead, river port and national capital.

Present day 

The railway line and the port of Matadi are currently the main connection for Kinshasa to the external world. The renovation of the Road to Matadi, in beginning of the 2000s, however somewhat alleviated this situation.

The railway line is underused and dangerous.

2012 

Angola is proposing to link its three isolated lines, and also to link with adjacent countries including the Matadi-Kinshasa line.  By using the Matadi Bridge which used to be a road-rail bridge, a connection to the Cabinda enclave is possible.

2015
The line reopened in September 2015 after around a decade without regular service. As of April, 2016 there was one passenger trip per week along the line and more frequent service was planned.

Incidents 

On November 26, 2003, a train ran off the line after hitting a landslide and fell into the river, resulting in ten casualties.

See also 
 Congo-Ocean Railway in the Republic of Congo.
 Congo Railway
 List of rail accidents (2000–present)
 Minimum railway curve radius
 Rail transport in the Democratic Republic of the Congo

References

760 mm gauge railways in the Democratic Republic of the Congo
Transport in Kinshasa
Matadi
3 ft 6 in gauge railways in the Democratic Republic of the Congo
1898 establishments in the Congo Free State
Railway lines in the Democratic Republic of the Congo